Electoral reform in Michigan refers to efforts, proposals and plans to change the election and voting laws of Michigan. In 2004, Ferndale residents overwhelmingly passed Proposal B, implementing instant-runoff voting. Ballot access laws in Michigan are rather restrictive, as they currently require a political party to submit 38,024 signatures, including 100 signatures from half of all Michigan Congressional districts. The Michigan Third Parties Coalition is seeking to relax those requirements. So far, no bills have been introduced in the Michigan Legislature to join the National Popular Vote Interstate Compact.

References

Politics of Michigan
Michigan